Boxford Chalk Pit is a  geological Site of Special Scientific Interest in Boxford in Berkshire. It is a Geological Conservation Review site.

This site has a unique succession of tilted beds dating to the Upper Cretaceous, between the late Coniacian and the Santonian, from around 87 to 84 million years ago. The beds are overlain by chalk which contains fractured and folded pieces of hardground, which are interpreted as evidence of localised tectonism unknown in the rest of Britain in this period. There are also coprolites and many tiny fish teeth.

References

Sites of Special Scientific Interest in Berkshire
Geological Conservation Review sites